The National Executive Committee (NEC) of the African National Congress (ANC) is the party's chief executive organ. It is elected every five years at the party’s national conference; the executive committee, in turn, elects a National Working Committee for day-to-day decision-making responsibilities. At the NEC's head is the president of the ANC, and it also contains the other so-called "Top Seven" leaders (formerly "Top Six"): the deputy president, chairperson, secretary-general, two deputy secretaries-general and treasurer-general.

Composition 

Members of the NEC must have been paid-up members of the ANC for at least five years prior to nomination, and at least half must be women. The NEC consists of:

 The "Top Seven" (president, deputy president, national chairperson, secretary-general, two deputy secretaries-general, and treasurer-general);
 Eighty further members; 
 Ex officio members, comprising two leaders from each of the ANC Women's League, ANC Youth League, ANC Veterans' League, and nine ANC Provincial Executive Committees; and
 Up to five additional co-opted members.
The size of the elected NEC was increased to 56 members (including the Top Six) at the 48th National Conference in 1991, and then to 66 members (including the Top Six) at the 49th National Conference in 1994 – during apartheid, the NEC had been smaller and of a less consistent size, sometimes dropping below ten members. It was enlarged again, to 86 members, at the 52nd National Conference in 2007, which also introduced the gender parity requirement, and further enlarged again to its current size of 87 members at the 55th National Conference with the introduction of a 2nd Deputy Secretary-General. Another significant change has been the extension of the term of the NEC from three years to five years, following the resolution of the 1997 50th National Conference to reduce the frequency of national conferences to twice a decade.

Election process 
Until 1985, members of the NEC were not appointed by election, but rather were appointed and seconded on a much more ad hoc basis, at the discretion of the leadership. In recent years, however, members of the NEC are elected by secret ballot at the ANC's national conference under clear rules. The Top Seven is elected separately, usually before the election of the rest of the NEC.

Nominations 
Nominations for the NEC and Top Seven emanate from the local branch level. In the run-up to a National Conference, every ANC branch in good standing holds a branch nomination meeting, at which, provided it is quorate, it may nominate one individual for each of the "Top Seven" leadership positions and up to 20 individuals for the other 80 NEC positions. Nominees must receive the support of 50% + 1 members present at the meeting, and at least half of the NEC nominees must be women – if necessary, the names of the lowest ranked male candidates must be removed until gender parity is achieved. The official branch nominations are consolidated at a provincial general council meeting, and the 250 nominees who received the most nominations become the provincial nominees for the NEC. Gender parity remains a condition at the provincial level, and women nominees are upgraded on the list if necessary to meet it. The individuals who received the most nominations for the Top Seven positions become the provincial nominees for those positions.

At the National Conference, the lists of provincial nominees are consolidated, along with the lists of nominees from the leagues, which hold nomination conferences in the same way as the provinces. The availability of nominees to stand in the elections is confirmed, and all voting delegates are also allowed to propose additional nominations from the floor at the conference, although such proposals only succeed if 25% of delegates support them.

Campaigning 

Although since 1994 the election of the NEC has often been preceded by considerable political manoeuvring, the ANC has a long history of valuing democratic centralism and collective leadership, and overt campaigning for internal leadership positions is frowned upon. This attitude is encapsulated, and promoted, in a discussion paper adopted by the National Working Committee in 2001 and reviewed in 2021, titled Through the Eye of a Needle?: Choosing the Best Cadres to Lead Transformation. The paper warns that "electoral processes" should not "tear the movement apart," and thatit is a matter of profound cultural practice within the ANC that individuals do not promote or canvass for themselves. Historically, this has justifiably been frowned upon as being in bad revolutionary taste.

Subcommittees in exile

Revolutionary Council 
In 1969, while based primarily in Tanzania, the NEC established the Revolutionary Council, which focused on both political and military aspects of the internal anti-apartheid struggle. Notably, the Revolutionary Council included several leaders of the ANC's military wing, Umkhonto we Sizwe (MK) – this in a period in which the NEC was limited to blacks ("Africans") only, while MK leadership (and thus the council) included several whites, Indians, and coloureds, especially from the Communist Party. Although it was located under the NEC, the council had considerable power. From around 1976, it was responsible for two subordinate structures: the Internal Political Reconstruction Committee, focused on the South African political underground and internal propaganda, and MK Central Operations HQ, focused on internal armed struggle.

The Revolutionary Council was chaired by ANC president Oliver Tambo throughout its lifespan, and other members included (with approximate dates): 

 Yusuf Dadoo (1969–1983)
 Peter Dlamini (1976–1983)
 Steve Dlamini (1976–1983)
 John Gaetsewe (1969–1976)
 Joe Gqabi (1977–1983)
 Chris Hani (1976–1983)
 Joe Jele (1976–1983)
 Moses Kotane (1969–1976)
 Moses Mabhida (secretary 1970–1983)
 Mac Maharaj (1977–1983)
 Simon Makana (1969–1983)
 Johnny Makathani (1976–1983)
 Cassius Make (1977–1983)
 Tennyson Makiwane (1969–1976)
 Robert Manci (1976–1983)
 JB Marks (1969–1972)
 Andrew Masondo (1969–1983)
 Jacob Masondo (1969–1983)
 Joe Matthews (secretary 1969–1970)
 Thabo Mbeki (1969–1983)
 Joe Modise (1969–1983)
 Ruth Mompati (1969–1976)
 Florence Moposho (1976–1983)
 John Motshabi (1969–1983)
 John Nkadimeng (1977–1983)
 Duma Nokwe (1969–1978)
 Mzwai Piliso (1969–1983)
 Godfrey Pule (1977–1983)
 Robert Resha (1969–1976)
 Jackie Sedibe (1969–1976)
 Reg September (1969–1976)
 Gertrude Shope (1976–1983)
 Sizakele Sigxashe (1977–1983)
 Joe Slovo (1969–1983)
 Bogart Soze (1976–1983)
 Lennox Tshali (1976–1983)
 Peter Tshikare (1977–1983)
 Jacob Zuma (1977–1983)
From around 1976, there was also a Revolutionary Council structure in London, chaired by Yusuf Dadoo and including Jack Hodgson, Ronnie Kasrils, Aziz Pahad, Reg September, and Solly Smith.

Politico-Military Council 
In 1983, the Revolutionary Council was replaced by the Politico-Military Council (PMC), which became "the executive arm of the NEC in relation to all matters pertaining to the conduct of the political and military struggle inside South Africa." This followed a meeting of all commanders and commissars in Luanda, at which concerns included the intensification of internal struggle and co-ordination between the military and political aspects of struggle, with greater political control envisaged over MK activities and strategy. The full PMC met monthly, while its executive committee or "secretariat" met weekly.

The 1983 restructuring also led to the establishment of other bodies under the NEC. At least two of these, the Political HQ (replaced by the expanded Internal Political Committee in 1987) and the Military HQ, fell under the ambit of the PMC and were represented in the PMC. ANC intelligence structures were also represented, and the PMC was responsible for coordinating the activities of these three wings. The PMC, like many other ANC structures, was dissolved before 1991 during the transition to democracy in South Africa, which brought the unbanning and return from exile of the ANC, as well as the de-escalation of MK activities.

Like the Revolutionary Council, the PMC was chaired by Tambo. Members included:

 Chris Hani (1983–1990)
 Joe Jele (1983–1990)
 Ronnie Kasrils (1985–1990)
 Moses Mabhida (1983–1987)
 Mac Maharaj (1983–1990)
 Cassius Make (1983–1987)
 Andrew Masondo (1983–1985)
 Joe Modise (1983–1990)
 Ruth Mompati (1983–1990)
 John Motshabi (1983–1990)
 Joel Netshitenzhe (1985–1990)
 Joe Nhlanhla (1983–1990)
 John Nkadimeng (1983–1987)
 Thomas Nkobi (1983–1985)
 Alfred Nzo (1983–1985)
 Mzwai Piliso (1983–1987)
 Reg September (1983–1985)
 Sizakele Sigxashe (1983–1990)
 Joe Slovo (1983–1990)
 Steve Tshwete (1985–1990)
 Jacob Zuma (1983–1990)

The London-based PMC was led by Aziz Pahad and Wally Serote.

Current subcommittees

National Working Committee 

Soon after each national conference, the newly constituted NEC appoints – at least in recent years, by election – a smaller National Working Committee (NWC), which implements NEC decisions and oversees the daily business of the ANC, including in the provincial branches and in Parliament. Some members are appointed full-time and have specific party responsibilities, while others hold other political offices. The NWC consists of:

 The Top Seven;
 Additional members, not exceeding one-quarter of the directly elected NEC (around twenty members); and
 Three ex officio members, comprising one representative appointed by each of the ANC Women's League, ANC Youth League, and ANC Veterans' League.

As in other ANC structures, at least half of the members must be women. Other ANC members may also be invited to attend or participate as non-voting members.

Current members 
The current NWC was elected on 29 January 2023, following the NEC's first meeting after the 55th National Conference. It will serve until December 2027. In addition to the Top Seven, the members are:

Mmamoloko Kubayi
Barbara Creecy
Enoch Godongwana
Tina Joemat-Pettersson
Zizi Kodwa
Ronald Lamola
David Mahlobo
Pemmy Majodina
Thandi Modise
Sibongile Besani
Stella Ndabeni-Abrahams
Mdumiseni Ntuli
Angie Motshekga
Senzo Mchunu
Mondli Gungubele
Mduduzi Manana
Peggy Nkonyeni
Thembi Nkadimeng
Nonceba Mhlauli
Khumbudzo Ntshavheni

National List Committee 
The National List Committee reports to, and is appointed annually by, the NEC. It is responsible for the selection of ANC candidates for the national Parliament, and it also oversees and regulates the provincial selection processes. The committee was established following amendments to the ANC constitution by the 50th National Conference in 1997, prior to which the parliamentary selection process had been less centralised.

Other subcommittees 
The NEC is responsible for several other subcommittees, which are primarily staffed by NEC members and whose composition is agreed by the NEC early in its term. Important is the national Deployment Committee (chaired by Deputy President David Mabuza), which was established in 1998 to implement resolutions of the 50th National Conference which endorsed a policy of ANC cadre deployment in the public service and "key centres of power." Other NEC subcommittees include the Economic Transformation Committee (chaired by Finance Minister Enoch Godongwana), the Elections Committee (chaired by Fikile Mbalula), a National Disciplinary Committee of Appeal (chaired by Nomvula Mokonyane), and over a dozen others.

Current membership

Membership in exile

National Executive Committee 1963–1969 
In 1960, the ANC was banned in South Africa, and much of its leadership had been arrested, especially during the Treason Trial and later the Rivonia Trial. The ANC therefore set about re-establishing command structures in exile, from a new base in Tanzania.

Leadership
 President: Albert Luthuli (d. 1967), then Oliver Tambo (acting)
 Chairperson: Oliver Tambo
 Secretary-General: Duma Nokwe
 Treasurer: Moses Kotane

Members

 Jimmy Hadebe
 Moses Mabhida
 Johnny Makathini
 Ambrose Makiwane
 Tennyson Makiwane
 J. B. Marks
 Joe Matthews
 Joe Modise
 Themba Mqota
 Mendy Msimang
 Thomas Nkobi
 Alfred Nzo
 Mzwai Piliso
 Robert Resha
 Mark Shope
 Dan Tloome

National Executive Committee 1969–1976 
The NEC was appointed during the 1969 conference in Morogoro, Tanzania, the ANC's first in exile. The NEC was not elected by the party's membership and, as indicated below, it co-opted additional members after 1969 "as the leadership saw fit."

Leadership
 Acting President: Oliver Tambo (acting)
 Secretary-General: Duma Nokwe (until 1969), then Alfred Nzo
 Treasurer: Moses Kotane (until 1968), then J. B. Marks

Members

 John Gaetsewe (co-opted)
 Joe Gqabi (co-opted)
 Jimmy Hadebe
 Chris Hani (co-opted)
 Joe Jele (co-opted)
 Moses Mabhida
 Simon Makana (co-opted)
 Johnny Makathini
 Henry Makgothi (co-opted)
 Ambrose Makiwane (expelled in 1972)
 Tennyson Makiwane (expelled in 1972)
 Robert Manci (co-opted)
 Andrew Masondo (co-opted)
 Joe Matthews
 Thabo Mbeki (co-opted)
 Joe Modise
 Florence Moposho (co-opted)
 John Motshabi
 Themba Mqota (expelled in 1972)
 John Nkadimeng (co-opted)
 Thomas Nkobi
 Mzwai Piliso
 Robert Resha
 Dan Tloome
 Jacob Zuma (co-opted)

National Executive Committee 1976–1985 

The NEC continued to be appointed without elections over this period, and its composition changed very little.

Leadership
 President: Oliver Tambo
 Secretary-General: Alfred Nzo
 Treasurer: Thomas Nkobi
 Administrative Secretary: Joe Nhlanhla (from 1978)

Members

 Steve Dlamini
 Joe Gqabi
 Chris Hani (from 1980)
 Joe Jele
 Moses Mabhida
 Simon Makana
 Johnny Makathini
 Robert Manci
 Andrew Masondo
 Thabo Mbeki
 Joe Modise
 Florence Moposho
 John Motshabi
 John Nkadimeng
 Duma Nokwe (d. 1978)
 Mzwai Piliso
 Gertrude Shope
 Jacob Zuma

National Executive Committee 1985–1991 
The NEC was elected in May 1985 in Kabwe, Zambia, and was the ANC's first fully elected NEC. In 1990, the ANC was unbanned and held a national consultative conference in Johannesburg – the first official meeting between exiles, underground members, and formerly imprisoned members – at which leaders who had not attended the Kabwe conference reaffirmed the composition of the NEC as elected at Kabwe.

Leadership
 President: Oliver Tambo
 Secretary-General: Alfred Nzo
 Treasurer: Thomas Nkobi

Members

 Chris Hani
 Joe Jele
 Pallo Jordan
 Ronnie Kasrils (from 1987)
 Hermanus Loots
 Moses Mabhida (d. 1986)
 Mac Maharaj
 Simon Makana
 Johnny Makathini
 Cassius Make (d. 1987)
 Henry Makgothi
 Robert Manci
 Thabo Mbeki
 Francis Meli
 Sindiso Mfenyana (from 1987)
 Joe Modise
 Ruth Mompati
 Tony Mongalo
 Florence Moposho
 John Motshabi
 Godfrey Ngwenya (from 1987)
 Joe Nhlanhla
 John Nkadimeng
 Aziz Pahad (from 1987)
 Jackie Sedibe (from 1987)
 Jackie Selebi
 Reg September
 Gertrude Shope
 Sizakele Sigxashe
 Zola Skweyiya
 Joe Slovo
 Dan Tloome
 Steve Tshwete
 Jacob Zuma

Membership after 1990

National Executive Committee 1991–1994 

The NEC was elected at the ANC's 48th National Conference in Durban in July 1991. Nelson Mandela was elected ANC president, replacing Oliver Tambo, who had suffered a stroke in 1989 and stepped down after 24 years as president. As indicated below, the NEC voted to co-opt five additional members after 1991, in order to fill vacancies arising from deaths and resignations.

Leadership
 President: Nelson Mandela
 Deputy President: Walter Sisulu
National Chairperson: Oliver Tambo (d. 1993), then Thabo Mbeki
 Secretary-General: Cyril Ramaphosa
 Deputy Secretary-General: Jacob Zuma
 Treasurer-General: Thomas Nkobi

Members

* Members of the National Working Committee

 Kader Asmal
 Thozamile Botha (resigned)
 Cheryl Carolus*
 Jeremy Cronin
 Ebrahim Ebrahim*
 Harry Gwala
 Chris Hani* (d. 1993)
 Josiah Jele (co-opted)
 Pallo Jordan*
 Ronnie Kasrils*
 Ahmed Kathrada
 Terror Lekota*
 Saki Macozoma
 Penuell Maduna
 Mac Maharaj
 Rocky Malebane-Metsing
 Winnie Mandela
 Trevor Manuel*
 Gill Marcus
 Barbara Masekela*
 Thabo Mbeki*
 Raymond Mhlaba
 Wilton Mkwayi
 Andrew Mlangeni
 Joe Modise*
 Peter Mokaba
 Popo Molefe
 Ruth Mompati
 Valli Moosa*
 Elias Motsoaledi (d. 1994)
 Mendi Msimang
 Sydney Mufamadi*
 Billy Nair
 Sister Bernard Ncube
 Joel Netshitenzhe*
 Joe Nhlanhla
 John Nkadimeng*
 Sankie Nkondo (co-opted)
 Charles Nqakula (co-opted)
 Siphiwe Nyanda (resigned)
 Alfred Nzo*
 Dullah Omar
 Aziz Pahad
 Albie Sachs (resigned)
 Reg September
 Gertrude Shope
 Albertina Sisulu
 Zola Skweyiya*
 Joe Slovo*
 Marion Sparg
 Arnold Stofile
 Raymond Suttner
 Steve Tshwete*
 Mcwayizeni Zulu
 Nkosazana Zuma (co-opted)

National Executive Committee 1994–1997 

The NEC was elected at the ANC's 49th National Conference in Bloemfontein in December 1994. Well represented are former Robben Island prisoners, as well as trade unionists and other former leaders of internal anti-apartheid structures, such as the United Democratic Front, who joined the ANC following its unbanning and return to South Africa. Four additional unelected members were coopted onto the NEC after 1994, to fill vacancies arising from resignations and deaths.

Leadership
 President: Nelson Mandela
 Deputy President: Thabo Mbeki
 Secretary-General: Cyril Ramaphosa (resigned in 1996, replaced by Cheryl Carolus in an acting capacity)
 Deputy Secretary-General: Cheryl Carolus
 National Chairperson: Jacob Zuma
 Treasurer-General: Arnold Stofile

Elected members

* Members of the National Working Committee

 Kader Asmal
Sibusiso Bengu
 Thozamile Botha (resigned)
 Jeremy Cronin
 Thoko Didiza (co-opted)
 Chris Dlamini (co-opted)
 Ebrahim Ismail Ebrahim
Alec Erwin
 Frene Ginwala*
 John Gomomo (resigned)
 Harry Gwala (d. 1995)
Derek Hanekom
 Limpho Hani
 Bantu Holomisa (expelled in 1996)
 Lulu Johnson
 Pallo Jordan*
 Ronnie Kasrils
 Ahmed Kathrada
Baleka Kgositsile
 Terror Lekota
 Brigitte Mabandla (co-opted)
 Saki Macozoma*
Penuell Maduna
 Mac Maharaj*
 Winnie Mandela
 Trevor Manuel
Mavivi Manzini
 Nosiviwe Mapisa-Nqakula (co-opted)
 Gill Marcus*
 Moses Mayekiso
 Tito Mboweni*
 Raymond Mhlaba
 Wilton Mkwayi
 Joe Modise
Thandi Modise
Peter Mokaba
 Ruth Mompati
 Valli Moosa
 Linda Mti
 Thenjiwe Mtintso*
 Sydney Mufamadi*
 S'bu Ndebele
 Joel Netshitenzhe*
 Smuts Ngonyama
 Joe Nhlanhla
Carl Niehaus
 Sankie Nkondo
 Charles Nqakula
 Blade Nzimande*
 Alfred Nzo
 Dullah Omar*
 Aziz Pahad
Essop Pahad
Jeff Radebe
 Sam Shilowa (resigned)
 Stella Sigcau
 Max Sisulu
 Zola Skweyiya
 Joe Slovo (d. 1995)
 Raymond Suttner
Adelaide Tambo
 Steve Tshwete*
 Tony Yengeni
 Nkosazana Zuma*

Ex officio members

 Winnie Mandela* (Women's League)
 Nosiviwe Mapisa-Nqakula (Women's League)
 Lulu Johnson* (Youth League)
 Mpho Lekgoro (Youth League)
 Malusi Gigaba* (Youth League)
 Ngaoko Ramathlodi (Northern Transvaal)
 Collins Chabane (Northern Transvaal)
 Popo Molefe (North West)
 Ndleleni Duma (North West)
 Mathews Phosa (Eastern Transvaal)
 Solly Zwane (Eastern Transvaal)
 Tokyo Sexwale (Gauteng)
 Paul Mashatile (Gauteng)
 Jacob Zuma (KwaZulu-Natal)
 Senzo Mchunu (KwaZulu-Natal)
 Pat Matosa (Free State)
 Kaiser Sebothelo (Free State)
 Manne Dipico (Northern Cape)
 William Steenkamp (Northern Cape)
 Dumisani Mafu (Eastern Cape)
 Bongani Gxilishe (Eastern Cape)
 Chris Nissen (Western Cape)
 James Ngculu (Western Cape)

National Executive Committee 1997–2002 

At the ANC's 50th National Conference in Mafikeng in December 1997, Thabo Mbeki was elected Mandela's successor as ANC president. After 1997, as indicated below, eleven additional members were co-opted onto the NEC. Five were co-opted in February 1998, soon after the conference, and the other six were co-opted later to fill vacancies arising from resignations and deaths.

Leadership
 President: Thabo Mbeki
 Deputy President: Jacob Zuma
 Secretary-General: Kgalema Motlanthe
 Deputy Secretary-General: Thenjiwe Mtintso
 National Chairperson: Terror Lekota
 Treasurer-General: Mendi Msimang

Elected members

* Members of the National Working Committee

 Kader Asmal
 Sibusiso Bengu
 Collins Chabane
 Frank Chikane
 Jeremy Cronin
 Phillip Dexter
 Thoko Didiza*
 Manne Dipico
 Jessie Duarte
 Ebrahim Ismail Ebrahim (co-opted in 1998)
 Alec Erwin
 Geraldine Fraser-Moleketi
 Frene Ginwala*
 Enoch Godongwana
 Derek Hanekom
 Limpho Hani (resigned)
 Pallo Jordan
 Ronnie Kasrils
 Baleka Kgositsile
 Jomo Khasu (co-opted)
 Brigitte Mabandla*
 Saki Macozoma
 Penuell Maduna*
Mac Maharaj (resigned)
 Dumisani Makhaye
 Thabang Makwetla (co-opted)
 Winnie Mandela*
 Trevor Manuel
 Mavivi Manzini*
 Nosiviwe Mapisa-Nqakula (co-opted in 1998)
Gill Marcus (resigned)
 Candith Mashego-Dlamini (co-opted)
 January Masilela (co-opted)
 Amos Masondo
 Ivy Matsepe-Casaburri
Tito Mboweni (resigned)
 Smangaliso Mkhatshwa
 Zweli Mkhize
 Phumzile Mlambo-Ngcuka
 Joe Modise (d. 2001)
 Thandi Modise (co-opted in 1998)
Peter Mokaba (d. 2002)
Popo Molefe (resigned)
 Jabu Moleketi
 Valli Moosa
 Sankie Mthembi-Mahanyele
 Sydney Mufamadi*
 Jay Naidoo
S'bu Ndebele (resigned)
 Joel Netshitenzhe*
 Smuts Ngonyama* (co-opted)
 Joe Nhlanhla*
 Charles Nqakula
 Blade Nzimande
Alfred Nzo (d. 2000)
 Dullah Omar
 Aziz Pahad
 Essop Pahad
 Dipuo Peters (co-opted)
 Jeff Radebe*
 Cyril Ramaphosa
Ngoako Ramatlhodi (resigned)
 Mbhazima Shilowa
 Stella Sigcau (co-opted in 1998)
 Lindiwe Sisulu
 Max Sisulu*
 Zola Skweyiya*
 Manto Tshabalala-Msimang* (co-opted in 1998)
Steve Tshwete (d. 2002)
 Tony Yengeni
 Nkosazana Zuma*

Ex officio members

 Nelson Mandela*
 Bathabile Dlamini (Women's League)
 Malusi Gigaba* (Youth League)
 Fikile Mbalula (Youth League)
 Popo Molefe (North West)
 Siphiwe Ngwenya (North West)
 Fish Mahlalela (Mpumalanga)
 Lucas Mello (Mpumalanga)
 Cassel Mathale (Limpopo)
 Ngoako Ramathlodi (Limpopo)
 David Makhura (Gauteng)
 S'bu Ndebele (KwaZulu-Natal)
 Sipho Gcabashe (KwaZulu-Natal)
 Pat Matosa (Free State)
 Ace Magashule (Free State)
 Neville Mompati (Northern Cape)
 Makhenkesi Stofile (Eastern Cape)
 Humphrey Maxegwana (Eastern Cape)
 Ebrahim Rasool (Western Cape)
 Mcebisi Skwatsha (Western Cape)

Observers

 Ngconde Balfour
 Ntombazana Botha
 Winkie Direko
 Dirk du Toit
 Cheryl Gillwald
 Lindiwe Hendricks
 Joyce Mabudafhasi
 Titus Mafolo
 Nathi Nhleko
 Membathisi Mdladlana
 Mandisi Mpahlwa
 Lawrence Mushwana
 Naledi Pandor
 Ngoako Ramathlodi
 Nozizwe Routledge-Madlala
 Susan Shabangu
 Enver Surty
 Toine Eggenhuizen
 Lucky Mabasa
 Naph Manana

National Executive Committee 2002–2007 

The NEC was elected at the ANC's 51st National Conference in Stellenbosch in 2002. The conference effected no change to the senior leadership of the party, except in the position of Deputy Secretary-General. Two additional members were co-opted into the NEC to fill vacancies which arose after 2002 when three members died and one resigned.

Leadership
 President: Thabo Mbeki
 Deputy President: Jacob Zuma
 Secretary-General: Kgalema Motlanthe
 Deputy Secretary-General: Sankie Mthembi-Mahanyele
 National Chairperson: Terror Lekota
 Treasurer-General: Mendi Msimang

Elected members

* Members of the National Working Committee

 Kader Asmal
 Collins Chabane
 Frank Chikane
 Jeremy Cronin
 Phillip Dexter
 Thoko Didiza*
 Manne Dipico
 Nkosazana Dlamini-Zuma*
 Jessie Duarte
 Ebrahim Ebrahim
 Alec Erwin
 Geraldine Fraser-Moleketi
 Malusi Gigaba
 Frene Ginwala
 Enoch Godongwana
 Derek Hanekom
 Pallo Jordan*
 Ronnie Kasrils
 Brigitte Mabandla*
 Saki Macozoma
 Penuell Maduna*
 Dumisani Makhaye (d. 2004)
 Thabang Makwetla
 Winnie Mandela (resigned)
 Trevor Manuel
 Nosiviwe Mapisa-Nqakula*
 Beatrice Marshoff (co-opted)
 Amos Masondo
 Ivy Matsepe-Casaburri
 Mavivi Manzini*
 Baleka Mbete*
 Membathisi Mdladlana
 Smangaliso Mkhatshwa
 Zweli Mkhize
 Phumzile Mlambo-Ngcuka*
 Thandi Modise
 Popo Molefe
 Jabu Moleketi
 Valli Moosa
 Thenjiwe Mtintso
 Sydney Mufamadi*
 Joel Netshitenzhe*
 Smuts Ngonyama*
 Charles Nqakula
 Blade Nzimande
 Dullah Omar (d. 2004)
 Aziz Pahad
 Essop Pahad
 Naledi Pandor
 Dipuo Peters
 Mathews Phosa
 Jeff Radebe*
 Cyril Ramaphosa
 Ngoako Ramatlhodi
 Susan Shabangu
 Stella Sigcau (d. 2006)
 Lindiwe Sisulu*
 Max Sisulu*
 Zola Skweyiya*
 Manto Tshabalala-Msimang*
 Ouma Tsopo (co-opted)
 Tony Yengeni

Ex officio members
 Nelson Mandela
Fikile Mbalula* (Youth League)

National Executive Committee 2007–2012 

The NEC was elected at the ANC's 52nd National Conference in Polokwane in December 2007. Incumbent ANC and national president Thabo Mbeki was defeated by Jacob Zuma in the vote for the Presidency. After 2007, three members died and six resigned (two to defect to the newly founded Congress of the People); only three of those vacancies were filled by co-opting replacements.

Leadership
 President: Jacob Zuma
 Deputy president: Kgalema Motlanthe
 National Chairperson: Baleka Mbete
 Secretary-General: Gwede Mantashe
 Deputy Secretary-General: Thandi Modise
 Treasurer-General: Mathews Phosa

Elected members

* Members of the National Working Committee

 Nozabelo Ruth Bhengu
 Nyami Booi
 Lynne Brown
 Zoleka Rosemary Capa-Langa
 Bheki Cele (resigned)
 Collins Chabane*
 Jeremy Cronin
 Nkosazana Dlamini-Zuma
 Bathabile Dlamini*
 Ayanda Dlodlo
 Jessie Duarte*
 Ndleleni Duma
 Ebrahim Ebrahim
 Malusi Gigaba
 Enoch Godongwana
 Derek Hanekom
 Hazel Jenkins
 Tina Joemat-Pettersson*
 Pallo Jordan*
 Ncumisa Kondlo* (d. 2008)
 Charlotte Lobe (resigned)
 Janet Love (resigned)
 Brigitte Mabandla
 Rejoice Mabudafhasi
 David Mabuza
 Nozizwe Madlala-Routledge (resigned)
 Dikeledi Magadzi
 Ace Magashule
Kgomotso Magau (co-opted)
 Sibongile Manana
 Winnie Mandela
 Trevor Manuel
 Nosiviwe Mapisa-Nqakula
 Billy Masetlha
 Joyce Mashamba
 Phumulo Masualle
 Noluthando Mayende-Sibiya*
 Fikile Mbalula*
 Nomaindia Mfeketo*
 Zweli Mkhize
 Nomvula Mokonyane
Ellen Molekane (co-opted)
 Joyce Moloi-Moropa
 Valli Moosa (resigned)
 Playfair Morule
 Angie Motshekga*
 Mathole Motshekga
 Aaron Motsoaledi
 Sankie Mthembi-Mahanyele
 Jackson Mthembu
 Nathi Mthethwa*
 Thenjiwe Mtintso
 Thaba Mufamadi
 S'bu Ndebele
 Joel Netshitenzhe
 Maite Nkoana-Mashabane*
 Nosipho Ntwanambi
 Siphiwe Nyanda*
 Blade Nzimande*
 Naledi Pandor
 Joe Phaahla
 Febe Potgieter-Gqubule
 Dina Pule*
 Jeff Radebe*
 Cyril Ramaphosa
 Ngoako Ramatlhodi
 Tokyo Sexwale
 Susan Shabangu*
 Sicelo Shiceka (d. 2012)
 Lyndall Shope-Mafole (resigned)
 Lindiwe Sisulu*
 Max Sisulu*
Salome Sithole (co-opted)
 Zola Skweyiya
 Makhenkesi Stofile*
 Thandi Tobias
 Sisisi Tolashe
 Manto Tshabalala-Msimang (d. 2009)
 Sue van der Merwe
 Fikile Xasa
 Lumka Yengeni
 Tony Yengeni*
 Lindiwe Zulu

Ex officio members
 Nelson Mandela
 Thabo Mbeki

National Executive Committee 2012–2017 

The NEC was elected at the ANC's 53rd National Conference in Mangaung in December 2012, and Jacob Zuma was elected ANC president for a second term. Four members were co-opted onto the NEC after 2012 to fill vacancies arising from deaths.

Leadership

 President: Jacob Zuma
 Deputy President: Cyril Ramaphosa
 National Chairperson: Baleka Mbete
 Secretary-General: Gwede Mantashe
 Deputy Secretary-General: Jessie Duarte
 Treasurer-General: Zweli Mkhize

Elected members

* Members of the National Working Committee

 Obed Bapela
 Nozabelo Ruth Bhengu
 Lynne Brown
 Zoleka Rosemary Capa-Langa
 Bheki Cele
 Collins Chabane* (d. 2015)
 Siyabonga Cwele
 Rob Davies
 Thoko Didiza
 Nkosazana Dlamini-Zuma
 Bathabile Dlamini*
 Sidumo Dlamini
 Ayanda Dlodlo
 Beauty Dlulane
 Ebrahim Ismail Ebrahim
 Lungi Gcabashe
 Malusi Gigaba*
 Enoch Godongwana
 Pravin Gordhan
 Derek Hanekom*
 Tina Joemat-Pettersson*
 Pallo Jordan (resigned)
 Zizi Kodwa
 Dipuo Letsatsi-Duba
 Pule Mabe
 Sisi Mabe* (d. 2014)
 Rejoice Mabudafhasi
 Nocawe Mafu
 Dikeledi Magadzi
 David Mahlobo*
 Fikile Majola
 Winnie Mandela
 Jane Manganye
 Kebby Maphatsoe
 Nosiviwe Mapisa-Nqakula*
 Philly Mapulane
 Billy Masetlha
 Joyce Mashamba
 Sam Mashinini
Fikile Mbalula (co-opted)
 Tito Mboweni
 Nomaindia Mfeketo*
Reginah Mhaule (co-opted)
 Humphrey Mmemezi
 Nomvula Mokonyane*
 Pinky Mokoto
 Edna Molewa
 Joyce Moloi-Moropa
 Pinky Moloi
 Angie Motshekga
Mathole Motshekga (co-opted)
 Aaron Motsoaledi*
 Sankie Mthembi-Mahanyele
 Jackson Mthembu*
 Nathi Mthethwa*
 Thenjiwe Mtintso
 S'bu Ndebele
 Joel Netshitenzhe
 Maite Nkoana-Mashabane*
 Gugile Nkwinti
 Sisi Ntombela*
 Nosipho Ntwanambi (d. 2014)
 Thulas Nxesi
 Blade Nzimande*
 Mildred Oliphant
 Naledi Pandor*
Dipuo Peters (co-opted)
 Joe Phaahla
 Jeff Radebe*
 Ngoako Ramatlhodi
 Miriam Segabutla
 Machwene Rosina Semenya
 Susan Shabangu*
 Lindiwe Sisulu*
 Max Sisulu
 Stone Sizani
 Mcebisi Skwatsha
 Sisisi Tolashe
 Pam Tshwete
 Sue van der Merwe
 Fikile Xasa*
 Tony Yengeni
 Senzeni Zokwana
 Lindiwe Zulu*

Ex officio members

 John Block (Northern Cape)
 Zamani Saul (Northern Cape)
 Phumulo Masualle (Eastern Cape)
 Oscar Mabuyane (Eastern Cape)
 Marius Fransman (Western Cape)
 Mjongile Songezo (Western Cape)
 David Mabuza (Mpumalanga)
 Lucky Ndinisa (Mpumalanga)
 Paul Mashatile (Gauteng)
 David Makhura (Gauteng)
 Supra Mahumapelo (North West)
 Kabelo Mataboge (North West)
 Cassel Mathale (Limpopo)
 Soviet Lekganyane (Limpopo)
 Sihle Zikalala (KwaZulu-Natal)
 Makgwe Ntate (Free State)
 Natso Khumalo (Veterans' League)
 Sandi Sejake (Veterans' League)

National Executive Committee 2017–2022 

In December 2017, the 54th National Conference, held at Nasrec, elected ANC deputy president Cyril Ramaphosa to succeed Jacob Zuma as ANC president. It also elected a new NEC. In October 2019, four additional members were co-opted onto the committee. 

Leadership

 President: Cyril Ramaphosa
 Deputy President: David Mabuza
 National Chairperson: Gwede Mantashe
 Secretary-General: Ace Magashule
 Deputy Secretary-General: Jessie Duarte
 Treasurer-General: Paul Mashatile
Elected members

 Obed Bapela
 Sibongile Besani
 Ruth Bhengu
 Bongani Bongo
 Alvin Botes
 Sfiso Buthelezi
 Firoz Cachalia (co-opted in 2019)
 Rosemary Capa
 Bheki Cele
 Sindisiwe Chikunga
 Barbara Creecy
 Siyabonga Cwele
 Thoko Didiza
 Bathabile Dlamini
 Sdumo Dlamini
 Nkosazana Dlamini-Zuma
 Ayanda Dlodlo (co-opted in 2019)
 Beauty Dlulane
 Malusi Gigaba
 Enoch Godongwana
 Pravin Gordhan
 Mondli Gungubele
 Derek Hanekom
 Tina Joemat-Pettersson
 Nkenke Kekana
 Pinky Kekana
 Noxolo Kiviet
 Zizi Kodwa
 Mmamoloko Kubayi
 Ronald Lamola
 Dakota Legoete
 Dipuo Letsatsi-Duba
 Zingiswa Losi
 Sylvia Lucas
 Pule Mabe
 Rejoice Mabudafhasi
 Nocawe Mafu
 Dikeledi Magadzi
 Tandi Mahambehlala
 David Mahlobo
 Collen Maine
 Pemmy Majodina
 Neva Makgetla
 Thabang Makwetla
 Mduduzi Manana
 Nosiviwe Mapisa-Nqakula
 Lindiwe Maseko (co-opted in 2019)
 Candith Mashego-Dlamini
 David Masondo
 Phumulo Masualle
 Joe Maswanganyi
 Fikile Mbalula
 Baleka Mbete
 Tito Mboweni
 Senzo Mchunu
 Nomaindia Mfeketo
 Reginah Mhaule
 Hlengiwe Mkhize
 Zweli Mkhize
 Thandi Modise
 Nomvula Mokonyane
 Edna Molewa (d. 2018)
 Pinky Moloi
 Angie Motshekga
 Mathole Motshekga
 Aaron Motsoaledi
 Jackson Mthembu
 Nathi Mthethwa
 Faith Muthambi
 Joel Netshitenzhe
 Maite Nkoana-Mashabane
 Blade Nzimande (co-opted in 2019)
 Mildred Oliphant
 Naledi Pandor
 Jeff Radebe
 Ngoako Ramathlodi
 Gwen Ramokgopa
 Susan Shabangu
 Lindiwe Sisulu
 Violet Siwela
 Pamela Tshwete
 Tokozile Xasa
 Tony Yengeni
 Lindiwe Zulu
 Mosebenzi Zwane

Ex-officio members

Hlomane Chauke
Suzan Dantjies
Lerumo Kalaka
Jacob Khawe
Natso Khumalo
Soviet Lekganyane
Oscar Mabuyane
David Makhura
Stanley Mathabatha
Mookgo Matuba
Ronalda Nalumango
Mandla Ndlovu
Lulama Ngcukayitobi
Deshi Ngxanya
Paseka Nompondo
Lindiwe Ntshalintshali
Mdumiseni Ntuli
Zamani Saul
Sihle Zikalala
Snuki Zikalala
Nonceba Mhauli (ANCYL NYTT)
Joy Maimela (ANCYL NYTT)
Nompondo Paseka (Free State)
Mxolisi Dukwana (Free State)

See also

 Provincial Executive Committees of the African National Congress

References

External links 
ANC NEC (2018 version)
ANC NEC (2021 version)

African National Congress
Executive committees of political parties